Aurora Network may refer to:
 Aurora (university network), a network of European universities
 A subsidiary of 37Games

See also 
 Aurora (disambiguation)